The 2010–11 Iranian Futsal Super League will be the 12th season of the Iran Pro League and the 7th under the name Futsal Super League. Foolad Mahan are the defending champions.

Teams

Managerial changes

League standings

Positions by round

Results table

Clubs season-progress

Top goalscorers 

Last updated: 17 February 2011

Awards 

 Winner: Shahid Mansouri
 Runners-up: Giti Pasand
 Third-Place: Foolad Mahan
 Top scorer:  Masoud Daneshvar (Giti Pasand) (24)

See also 
 2010–11 Futsal 1st Division
 2011 Futsal 2nd Division
 2010–11 Persian Gulf Cup
 2010–11 Azadegan League
 2010–11 Iran Football's 2nd Division
 2010–11 Iran Football's 3rd Division
 2010–11 Hazfi Cup
 Iranian Super Cup

References

External links 
 Futsal Planet 
 Futsal News 
 Iran cups 

Iranian Futsal Super League seasons
1